The women's 1 metre springboard competition of the diving events at the 2011 World Aquatics Championships was held on July 17 with the preliminary round and the final on July 19.

Medalists

Results
The preliminary round was held at 13:00. The final was held on July 19 at 14:00.

Green denotes finalists

References

External links
2011 World Aquatics Championships: Women's 1 m springboard entry list, from OmegaTiming.com; retrieved 2011-07-15.

Women's 1 m springboard
Aqua